Manilal Balabhai Nanavati was an Indian social worker and freedom fighter who served as the deputy governor of the Reserve Bank of India.

Early life 
He was born in Bombay (now Mumbai) and educated at the university there.

Career

Reserve Bank of India 
He served as the deputy governor of the Reserve Bank of India from 21 December 1936 to 21 December 1941.

Dr Balabhai Nanavati Hospital 
He founded Nanavati Hospital, located in Vile Parle, Mumbai, India,  which was inaugurated by Jawaharlal Nehru in November 1950, and opened in May 1951. Dr Balabhai Nanavati Hospital was taken over by Radiant Group.

Bibliography 
His notable books include:
 Rural life problems; personal experiences
 Group prejudices in India; a symposium 
 Fifty years of co-operation in Kodinar Taluka, a case study
 Report on the agricultural indebtedness in the Baroda state

Awards and honours 
He was awarded a knighthood by King George VI at the 1941 Birthday Honours in 1941.

References

External links 
 Official Website
 Biography

Indian businesspeople
Businesspeople from Mumbai
Indian industrialists
Indian Knights Bachelor